"What About Love" is a song Heart released in 1985.

What About Love may also refer to:

"What About Love" (Austin Mahone song), 2013
"What About Love" (The Desert Rose Band song), 1993
"What About Love" ('Til Tuesday song), 1986
"What About Love", a song by Banks from the album III
"What About Love?", a song by Lemar from the album Dedicated
"What About Love?", a song by Meat Loaf from the album Bat Out of Hell III: The Monster Is Loose
"What About Love?", a song from the musical The Color Purple
What About Love, an American romantic drama film starring Sharon Stone and Andy García

See also
"What About the Love", a 1988 song by Amy Grant